Hari Gopalakrishnan is an Indian film director best known for his action and masala films in Tamil cinema. He made his directorial debut with Thamizh (2002). He later directed films such as Saamy (2003), Kovil (2004), Ayya (2005), Thaamirabharani (2007), Vel (2007) and the Singam film series (2010-2017). He mostly directed Coimbatore, Dindigul, Tenkasi and Thoothukudi-Tirunelveli district based movies.

Early life
Hari was born in the Thoothukudi district in Tamil Nadu, India. His father, Gopalakrishnan, runs a grocery store. Later, his family moved to Chennai, where Hari graduated with a degree in Commerce.

Career
Hari first joined as an assistant, gaining experience by working with various directors; Senthilnathan, Jeevabalan, Ameerjan, K. Natraj in  Valli, Alex Pandian, Nassar in Avatharam. Later, he assisted K. Balachander in his film Kalki and worked as an associate director with Saran in the films Amarkalam, Parthen Rasithen and Alli Arjuna.

His first film, in 2002, was Thamizh, with Prashanth and Simran. Film critic Balaji commented that it was "one of the few movies in recent times where a lot of importance seems to have been attached to the script. In spite of the flimsy story and routine screenplay where a youth grows to be a "dada", the dialogs elevate the quality of the movie and make it very enjoyable". His second film Saamy, under the Kavithaalaya banner, starred Vikram. It was named the year's biggest hit, grossing 160 million. Its success led to remakes; in Telugu (Lakshmi Narasimha), Kannada (Ayya) and Hindi languages (Policegiri). His next two films Kovil, with Silambarasan and Arul also starred Vikram. In 2005, he made Ayya, starring Sarathkumar, which introduced Nayantara to Tamil cinema. His next film was Aaru, with Suriya in 2005. In 2007, he directed two films, Thaamirabharani with Vishal and Vel, with Suriya. In 2008, he directed Seval, with Bharath. Ayyappa Prasad from Nowrunning.com stated that Hari "panders to the taste of his rural audience all the way, but the movie is bound to disappoint city-dwellers, since neither the story nor its treatment appeal to anyone with high IQ."

In 2010 Hari directed his tenth film Singam, with Suriya, marking their third collaboration. The film was one of the top box office films of the year, although reviewers identified it as a standard masala entertainer. Following its success, the film was remade in Hindi (as Singham), in Kannada (as Kempe Gowda) and Bengali (Shotru). After directing Venghai, a film with Dhanush and Tamannaah Bhatia in the lead, he made a sequel to Singam, with Suriya reprising his role as Duraisingam. It was named one of the biggest box office hits of 2013, with Sify stating that it was "the biggest theatrical earner" of the year. He worked for the second time with Vishal, in a film titled Poojai, which had Shruti Haasan as the female lead. Hari joined with Suriya for the fifth time for (Singam 3). He is shooting Saamy Square, the sequel of Saamy starring Vikram in the lead role. This film marks the third collaboration between Hari and Vikram. The film has met with mixed response. After Saamy Square, Hari will most likely team up with Suriya yet again. Earlier, director Hari revealed that his next project with Suriya would not be Singam 4, but a fresh script. In an interview with an entertainment portal, Hari has disclosed details about this untitled film. In February 2020, Studio Green officially announced that Hari's next movie with Surya would be titled "Aruvaa", and would be released in Diwali 2020, but now Suriya has proceeded with his other projects and it is uncertain whether Aruvaa will happen or not. In June 2021, He started working with actor and also his brother-in-law, Arun Vijay, in their first collaboration, which also stars Priya Bhavani Shankar, Raadhika Sarathkumar and Yogi Babu, with music composed by G. V. Prakash Kumar titled Yaanai.

Personal life

Hari is married to former actress Preetha Vijayakumar, the daughter of Vijayakumar and Manjula, sister of actor Arun Vijay, and has three sons.

Filmmaking style
Hari's films are primarily in the action and masala genres. Due to his penchant for such films, he has been nicknamed "the aruva director", the aruva (sickle) being present in most of his films. Recurring elements in his films include "ferocious" heroes, comic subplots and item numbers. The heroes in his films are usually close to either their father or mother, and are surrounded by a large family. Hari's films are also known for being "racy", and some for the amount of blood and gore depicted onscreen.

Filmography

As writer and director

As lyricist

References

External links
 

Tamil film directors
Film directors from Tamil Nadu
People from Thoothukudi district
Living people
Tamil-language lyricists
21st-century Indian film directors
1966 births